Comrades was a 1983-84 BBC television documentary series and the related book about life in the Soviet Union composed mainly of interviews and fly on the wall filming of 'normal' Soviet citizens. BBC producer Richard Denton was able achieve a largely unprecedented degree of freedom in selecting and interviewing people.

U.S. airings 

FRONTLINE aired this programme on most PBS stations in 1986.

References

1985 British television series debuts
1986 British television series endings
1980s British documentary television series
Works about Russia
BBC television documentaries
English-language television shows